Academics, Members of Parliament, the general public and journalists alike have attempted to rank prime ministers of the United Kingdom and prime ministers of Great Britain. Those included below generally consist of only a subset of prime ministers, typically those of the 20th century or those who served after the Second World War.

Winston Churchill, David Lloyd George, Clement Attlee, and Margaret Thatcher generally appear toward the top of rankings, while Anthony Eden generally appears at the bottom.

Academic opinion 

In December 1999 a BBC Radio 4 poll of 20 prominent historians, politicians and commentators for The Westminster Hour produced the verdict that Churchill was the best British prime minister of the 20th century, with Lloyd George in second place and Clement Attlee in third place. As Blair was still in office he was not ranked. The worst prime minister in that survey was judged to be Anthony Eden.

In 2004, the University of Leeds and Ipsos Mori conducted an online survey of 258 academics who specialised in 20th-century British history and/or politics. There were 139 replies to the survey, a return rate of 54% – by far the most extensive survey done so far. The respondents were asked, among other historical questions, to rate all the 20th-century prime ministers in terms of their success and asking them to assess the key characteristics of successful ones. Respondents were asked to indicate on a scale of 0 to 10 how successful or unsuccessful they considered each prime minister to have been in office (with 0 being highly unsuccessful and 10 highly successful). A mean of the scores was calculated and a league table based on the mean scores. The five Labour prime ministers were, on average, judged to have been the most successful, with a mean of 6.0 (median of 5.9). The three Liberals averaged 5.8 (median of 6.2) and the twelve Conservatives 4.8 (median of 4.1).

In a 2006 issue of BBC History, historian Francis Beckett ranked the 20th-century prime ministers with points out of five in 2006, based on how well the leaders implemented their policies – not on the policies themselves. Margaret Thatcher and Clement Attlee shared the highest ranking.

In 2010, the University of Leeds and Woodnewton Associates carried out a survey of 106 academics who specialised in British politics or British history, to rank the performance of all 12 prime ministers who served between 1945 and 2010. Churchill's ranking was thus determined from his second term only.

In October 2016 the University of Leeds, in conjunction with Woodnewton Associates, surveyed 82 academics specialising in post-1945 British history and politics, following the Brexit referendum. Due to the date range, Churchill's oft-lauded war ministry and caretaker ministry were not in contention and he was judged solely on his second premiership.

Key:

Opinion of Members of Parliament 

In 2013, a group of academic staff and students at Royal Holloway, University of London, conducted a postal survey of British Members of Parliament, asking them to evaluate the success of post-war British prime ministers. Some 158 MPs replied to the survey, a response rate of 24%. The respondents were 69 Conservatives, 67 Labour MPs, 14 Liberal Democrats and 8 MPs from other parties.

The survey used the same question employed in the 2004 and 2010 University of Leeds studies: MPs were asked how successful or unsuccessful they considered each prime minister to have been using a 0 to 10 scale, where 0 meant highly unsuccessful and 10 meant highly successful.

Overall, MPs rated Margaret Thatcher as the most successful post-war prime minister, just ahead of Clement Attlee. With the exception of Edward Heath, who was judged more favourably by Labour MPs than by Conservatives, evaluations were split along party lines: Conservative MPs tended to consider Conservative prime ministers to be more successful than did Labour MPs, and Labour MPs generally gave Labour prime ministers higher scores than did Conservative MPs.

Key:

Popular opinion

BBC polls 2007 and 2008
The BBC television programme The Daily Politics asked viewers in 2007 to select their favourite Prime Minister out of a list of ten who served between 1945 and 2007 (excluding Churchill). In 2008, BBC Newsnight held a poll of 27,000 people, to decide the UK's greatest and worst post-war prime minister.

Key:

 
 
 
 
 

While the poll indicated that respondents should only consider the period from 1945 onwards, whether or not respondents opted to separate Churchill's first term (1940-45) from his second in their evaluation should be weighed in this evaluation versus other polls (e.g. of academics), who generally rate Churchill's second term as being substantially worse than his first by comparison.  Additionally, In a BBC poll to find the 100 Greatest Britons in 2002, five prime ministers were ranked in the top 100. Winston Churchill was voted greatest Briton, the Duke of Wellington was in 15th place, Margaret Thatcher was in 16th place, Tony Blair was 67th and David Lloyd George was 79th.

Journalistic opinion
Both The Times and Iain Dale have specifically ranked all (or almost all) prime ministers of the United Kingdom and prime ministers of Great Britain.

Key:

See also 
Historical rankings of prime ministers of Australia
Historical rankings of prime ministers of Canada
Historical rankings of chancellors of Germany
Historical rankings of prime ministers of the Netherlands
Historical rankings of presidents of the United States
100 Greatest Britons
List of current heads of government in the United Kingdom and dependencies

Notes

References

Further reading

External links

Lists of prime ministers of the United Kingdom
United Kingdom